William L. Slocum  (born November 21, 1947) is a former Republican member of the Pennsylvania State Senate.

Slocum pleaded guilty and spent a month in federal prison for filing false reports to the Pennsylvania Department of Environmental Protection and discharging raw sewage into Brokenstraw Creek while he was a sewage plant manager in Youngsville, Pennsylvania.

References

External links
 - official PA Senate profile (archived)

1947 births
Living people
Republican Party Pennsylvania state senators
Pennsylvania politicians convicted of crimes